Saint Low is a band and vehicle for singer-songwriter Mary Lorson, formerly of Madder Rose. Lorson formed the band in 2000, after taking a break from Madder Rose three years earlier.

In Madder Rose, Lorson sang lead vocals, but guitar player Billy Coté wrote the majority of songs on each album, leaving Lorson with a backlog of her own songs. After Madder Rose released its last album, Hello June Fool, in 1999, Lorson formed Saint Low to release that material. The band's second and third albums have been released under the moniker "Mary Lorson & Saint Low" due to confusion among fans, some of whom misinterpreted Saint Low as an alter-ego for Lorson, rather than a band name.

Although Saint Low is an American band and released in the US on LoveCat Music; in UK, its albums are released on Cooking Vinyl.

Discography
 "Keep An Open Mind/Anywhere", 1998 (single)
 "On The Outside", 2000 (single)
 Saint Low, 2000
 Tricks for Dawn, 2002 (as Mary Lorson & Saint Low)
 Realistic, 2005 (as Mary Lorson & Saint Low)

References

External links
Official Mary Lorson & Saint Low webpage
Saint Low on MySpace
[ Saint Low] at Allmusic

Indie rock musical groups from New York (state)
Musical groups established in 2000
Cooking Vinyl artists